From Here on In: The Singles 1997–2004 is a singles compilation album by Australian punk rock band The Living End, released in September 2004. It features new tracks, recorded at Sing Sing Studios in Melbourne, remasterings of older tracks and a bonus disc featuring some of the band's most successful cover songs.

Alongside this release, a DVD comprising a two-hour documentary and the band's music videos, From Here on In: The DVD 1997–2004, was also released.

ARIA publicised that From Here on In had officially achieved Platinum status in Australia in November 2007.

Track listing
"I Can't Give You What I Haven't Got"
"Prisoner of Society"
"Roll On"
"West End Riot"
"Second Solution"
"Bringin' It All Back Home"
"All Torn Down"
"Pictures in the Mirror"
"From Here On In"
"Save the Day"
"Who's Gonna Save Us?"
"One Said to the Other"
"Dirty Man"
"Tabloid Magazine"

Under the Covers (Bonus CD)
 "Sunday Bloody Sunday" (U2 cover)
 "Tainted Love" (live) (Gloria Jones cover)
 "I Get a Kick out of You"
 "Rip It Up"
 "10:15 Saturday Night"
 "Prisoner on the Inside"

Singles
"I Can't Give You What I Haven't Got", 2004 radio single, Triple J Hottest 100, 2004 #47

Charts

Certifications

References

See also
From Here on In: The DVD 1997–2004

The Living End albums
2004 compilation albums